Vast Oceans Lachrymose is the third full-length studio album by While Heaven Wept, and their first to feature lead vocalist Rain Irving.  Released in November 2009 by Italian label Cruz Del Sur, most of the material was ready in 2005 but was delayed by line up changes and label trouble.  Previous record label Rage of Achilles Records went out of business and Black Lotus Records (their  next label) filed for bankruptcy.  The album cover features the painting Christ Stilleth the Tempest by the late John Martin.

Track listing
  "The Furthest Shore"   -  15:50
  "To Wander the Void"   -  06:27
  "Living Sepulchre"   -  04:00
  "Vessel"   -  07:47
  "Vast Oceans Lachrymose"   -  05:01
  "Epilogue"  -  03:12

Credits
 Tom Phillips - Guitars, Keyboards, Harmony Vocals
 Rain Irving - Lead and Harmony Vocals
 Jim Hunter - Bass
 Scott Loose - Guitars
 Trevor Schrotz - Drums
 Michelle Schrotz - Keyboards and Harmony Vocals

References
http://www.whileheavenwept.com/

2009 albums
While Heaven Wept albums